George Henry Dunlop (July 19, 1888 – December 12, 1971) was a Major League Baseball infielder who played for two seasons. He played for the Cleveland Naps from 1913 to 1914, playing in eight total games.

External links

1888 births
1971 deaths
Major League Baseball infielders
Cleveland Naps players
New Britain Perfectos players
Omaha Rourkes players
Brantford Red Sox players
Albany Senators players